Al-Mashbouh (The Suspect) is a 1981 Egyptian romance movie directed by Samir Seif, starring Soad Hosny and Adel Emam. It tells the story of a burglar, a belly dancer, a policeman and a friend of them.

Cast
Soad Hosny as Batta.
 Adel Emam  as Maher.
 Farouk al-Fishawy as Tarek.
 Saeed Saleh as Bayoumy.

See also
 Egyptian films of the 1980s
 List of Egyptian films of 1981

References

1981 films
Egyptian romance films
1980s romance films